Elections to High Peak Borough Council in Derbyshire, England were held on 6 May 1999. All of the council was up for election and the Labour Party stayed in control of the council.

After the election, the composition of the council was:
Labour 27
Conservative 10
Liberal Democrat 5
Independent 2

Election result

Ward results

References

1999
High Peak
1990s in Derbyshire